Waterford District High School, also known as WDHS, is a public high school in Waterford, Ontario, Canada. It is the northernmost school in Norfolk County.

History
The first school board meeting for the new high school in Waterford was held on February 15, 1892. The board purchased 1.8 acres of land on the northeast corner of Main and Brown streets at a cost of $150 per acre. The building was constructed for about $7,000 and the enrollment in the first year was approximately 100 students. In 1936 the structure burned down, but was rebuilt and reopened in 1937.

Summary

Athletics
WDHS has a variety of sports teams including football, rugby, soccer, field lacrosse, basketball, volleyball, golf, badminton, tennis, track and field, hockey, and cheerleading. The team mascot is a wolf.

Fair Day
Each year, at the Norfolk County Fair, the students of Waterford District High School compete with other local high schools in events like tug-o-war, cheerleading, and road racing. Each school fills a separate area of the grandstands and is judged on spirit and decorations.

Grade 9 Day
Grade 9 day at Waterford District High School is a long-standing tradition. The grade 9 students are paired with senior studentsto complete activities. Following a crackdown on hazing by the school's administration, the day's events are considered to be a safe opportunity for students from grade 9 and grade 12 to get to know one another.

There is also a barbecue lunch for the students run by the school's student council.

Fall play & spring musical
There is an active drama, and music department at Waterford District High School that puts on yearly plays and musicals such as Catch Me If You Can and The Music Man.

Renovations
The school underwent renovations from 2010-2012. Modernized areas included science laboratories, a larger Edukids day care for staff members and unwed student mothers, new gymnasium floors, and an addition of new offices for the school board. The school now has an elevator.

Fundraising was done for a new electronic scoreboard for the football field, replacing the old manual score board. Conforming with Canadian high school football standards, the scoreboard shows the time and score of both teams along with the down, the yardage of the line of scrimmage, the yards to go until a first down, the team with the possession (usually signified with the outline of a football in lights next to the possessing team's score), and the quarter.

Future
Waterford District High School may face closure similar to the fate that Port Dover Composite School faced on January 31, 2013. Trends including homeschooling, the rapidly ageing local population and the increasing popularity of virtual high schools on the Internet has stunted the ability of the Norfolk County high schools to maintain full classrooms.

It has been suggested that if attendance continues to decline, a solution would be to close the school along with Simcoe Composite School and create a new secular high school spanning  somewhere in Norfolk County. This comes at the annoyance of the students, whose rivals at Valley Heights Secondary School and Delhi District Secondary School both have a sufficient number of students to remain open indefinitely according to their level of government funding.

See also
List of high schools in Ontario

References

Educational institutions established in 1892
High schools in Norfolk County, Ontario
1892 establishments in Ontario